Slow Waltz in Cedar Bend is a novel by Robert James Waller.  It was the third highest seller in the US in 1993, after Waller's Bridges of Madison County, to which this book was his followup, and John Grisham's The Client.  Over two million copies were in print by the end of 1993. Waller was himself an economics professor at Northern Iowa University and so writes about his experiences about the main protagonist.

Plot introduction
Michael Tillman is an unconventional Iowa tenured economics professor, rides a vintage motorcycle and walks barefoot as he teaches Boolean Algebra. He feels an immediate attraction to Jellie Braden when she walks into a dean's reception with her husband Jimmy. Their common experiences links Jellie and Michael together in India and within a year the affair in consummated. Jellie then disappears to India and Michael heads to Pondicherry to find Jellie and her complicated past. He eventually tracks her down to a hotel on Periyar Lake and her secrets are revealed...

Reception
 Kirkus Reviews states that the novel is better than Bridges of Madison County and concludes that "Jellie does indeed have a Big Secret, but it doesn't impede the blissful reunion of the lovers or their return stateside, where Jimmy cheerfully moves out of their way. With its sliver of suspense, this is a marginally better product than the dreadful Bridges—slicker, not quite so soppy. It should make Waller's army of fans delirious."
 Publishers Weekly also has reservations: "Waller's attempt at academic satire is a dud, but he renders the Indian settings quite effectively".

References

1993 American novels
American romance novels
Fictional professors
Novels set in India
Novels set in Iowa
Warner Books books